Medford is a city in Steele County, Minnesota, United States. The population was 1,239 at the 2010 census.

History
Medford was platted in 1856, and named for Medford Colling, the son of an early settler. A post office has been in operation at Medford since 1855.

Geography
The Straight River flows through the city.

Interstate 35 and Steele County Roads 1, 12, 22, 23, and 45 are the main routes in the community.

Demographics

2010 census
As of the census of 2010, there were 1,239 people, 450 households, and 336 families living in the city. The racial makeup of the city was 96.3% White, 0.9% African American, 0.1% Native American, 0.6% Asian, 0.8% from other races, and 1.4% from two or more races. Hispanic or Latino of any race were 5.2% of the population.

There were 450 households, of which 42.9% had children under the age of 18 living with them, 58.4% were married couples living together, 11.3% had a female householder with no husband present, 4.9% had a male householder with no wife present, and 25.3% were non-families. 21.6% of all households were made up of individuals, and 8.7% had someone living alone who was 65 years of age or older. The average household size was 2.74 and the average family size was 3.19.

The median age in the city was 34.4 years. 31.2% of residents were under the age of 18; 5.6% were between the ages of 18 and 24; 31.2% were from 25 to 44; 21.7% were from 45 to 64; and 10.3% were 65 years of age or older. The gender makeup of the city was 50.9% male and 49.1% female.

2000 census
As of the census of 2000, there were 984 people, 377 households, and 275 families living in the city. The racial makeup of the city was 94.00% White, 0.10% African American, 0.10% Native American, 0.61% Asian, 4.37% from other races, and 0.81% from two or more races. Hispanic or Latino of any race were 6.40% of the population.

There were 377 households, out of which 35.5% had children under the age of 18 living with them, 60.2% were married couples living together, 8.5% had a female householder with no husband present, and 26.8% were non-families. 21.8% of all households were made up of individuals, and 10.6% had someone living alone who was 65 years of age or older.  The average household size was 2.60 and the average family size was 3.01.

In the city, the population was spread out, with 25.4% under the age of 18, 10.6% from 18 to 24, 31.3% from 25 to 44, 23.2% from 45 to 64, and 9.6% who were 65 years of age or older.  The median age was 34 years. For every 100 females, there were 103.3 males.  For every 100 females age 18 and over, there were 106.2 males.

The median income for a household in the city was $50,000, and the median income for a family was $55,714. Males had a median income of $31,628 versus $24,318 for females. The per capita income for the city was $18,886.  About 3.3% of families and 4.4% of the population were below the poverty line, including 1.1% of those under age 18 and 9.8% of those age 65 or over.

Government
Medford, Minnesota is a statutory plan "A" city - it has a weak mayor/city council structure.  As of 2022, the mayor of the City of Medford is Danny Thomas.  Members of the City Council in 2020 are:   Chad Merritt, Manda Mueller, Chad Langeslag and Grace Bartlett.

Landmarks
The "Medford Bridge" runs over the Medford Park just at the end of Steele County Road 45 entering the city.  An apartment complex now occupies the area where one of the oldest school buildings that was used up until 2003. The town had decided that the old school was not large enough for the growing student body and a new school was to be built. The school now sits on the eastern edge of the city.  It is presently operating at capacity of nearly 800 students, with many coming from outside the district through open enrollment.  On the edge of town is the 1877 Daniel S. Piper House, Minnesota's only surviving example of a New England-style interconnected farmstead.  It is listed on the National Register of Historic Places.

Notable person
 Lynn Frazier – (1874–1947), former Governor of North Dakota; first governor ever recalled.  Born in Medford.

References

Cities in Minnesota
Cities in Steele County, Minnesota